Winniki  is a village in the administrative district of Gmina Namysłów, within Namysłów County, Opole Voivodeship, in south-western Poland.

Before the end of the second world war, the area was part of Germany (see Territorial changes of Poland after World War II).

References

Winniki